Fowler is a city in Meade County, Kansas, United States.  As of the 2020 census, the population of the city was 534.

History

Fowler was laid out and platted in 1886. It was named for George Fowler, the original owner of the town site.

Fowler was a shipping point on the Chicago, Rock Island and Pacific Railroad.

Geography

Climate
According to the Köppen Climate Classification system, Fowler has a semi-arid climate, abbreviated "BSk" on climate maps.

Demographics

2010 census
As of the census of 2010, there were 590 people, 231 households, and 150 families residing in the city. The racial makeup of the city was 91.5% White, 1.0% African American, 0.7% Native American, 0.8% Asian, 4.1% from other races, and 1.9% from two or more races. Hispanic or Latino of any race were 12.9% of the population.

There were 231 households, of which 37.2% had children under the age of 18 living with them, 51.9% were married couples living together, 8.7% had a female householder with no husband present, 4.3% had a male householder with no wife present, and 35.1% were non-families. 32.9% of all households were made up of individuals, and 19.1% had someone living alone who was 65 years of age or older. The average household size was 2.46 and the average family size was 3.14.

The median age in the city was 39.9 years. 27.6% of residents were under the age of 18; 5.6% were between the ages of 18 and 24; 23.3% were from 25 to 44; 22.5% were from 45 to 64; and 20.8% were 65 years of age or older. The gender makeup of the city was 49.2% male and 50.8% female.

2000 census
As of the census of 2000, there were 567 people, 234 households, and 146 families residing in the city. The racial makeup of the city was 93.12% White, 0.18% Native American, 5.29% from other races, and 1.41% from two or more races. Hispanic or Latino of any race were 10.41% of the population.

There were 234 households, out of which 29.5% had children under the age of 18 living with them, 55.1% were married couples living together, 3.8% had a female householder with no husband present, and 37.6% were non-families. 34.2% of all households were made up of individuals, and 17.9% had someone living alone who was 65 years of age or older. The average household size was 2.27 and the average family size was 2.97.

In the city, the population was spread out, with 23.5% under the age of 18, 5.3% from 18 to 24, 24.2% from 25 to 44, 20.3% from 45 to 64, and 26.8% who were 65 years of age or older. The median age was 43 years. For every 100 females, there were 82.9 males. For every 100 females age 18 and over, there were 77.9 males.

The median income for a household in the city was $33,214, and the median income for a family was $40,750. Males had a median income of $26,827 versus $19,028 for females. The per capita income for the city was $16,788. About 4.1% of families and 5.5% of the population were below the poverty line, including 1.6% of those under age 18 and 5.0% of those age 65 or over.

Education
Two schools, Fowler Elementary School and Fowler High School, comprise the Fowler Unified School District.

Notable people
 Tim Huelskamp, Congressman representing the Kansas' 1st Congressional District (2011-2017).

References

Further reading

External links

 City of Fowler
 Fowler - Directory of Public Officials
 Photos of early Fowler
 Fowler City Map, KDOT

Cities in Kansas
Cities in Meade County, Kansas